Gokak is one of the 224 seats in Karnataka State Assembly in India. It is part of Belagavi Lok Sabha seat.

Members of Assembly

Bombay State
 1951: Appana Ramappa Panchagavi, Indian National Congress

Mysore State
 1967: L. S. Naik, Indian National Congress
 1972: G. C. Tammanna, Indian National Congress

Karnataka State
 1978: Laxman Siddappa Nail, Indian National Congress (Indira)
 1983: Muttennavar Mallappa Laxman, Janata Party
 1985: Muttennavar Mallappa Laxman, Janata Party
 1989: Shankar Hanmant Karning, Indian National Congress
 1994: Nayak Chandrashekhar Sadashiv, Janata Dal
 1999: Ramesh Jarkiholi, Indian National Congress
 2004: Ramesh Jarkiholi, Indian National Congress
 2008: Ramesh Jarkiholi, Indian National Congress
 2013: Ramesh Jarkiholi, Indian National Congress
 2018: Ramesh Jarkiholi, Indian National Congress
 2019 (By-poll): Ramesh Jarkiholi, Bharatiya Janata Party

Election results

1967 Assembly Election
 L. S. Naik (INC) : 17,522 votes 
 P. H. Karaning (IND) : 7144

2008 Assembly Election
 Jarkiholi Ramesh Laxmanrao (INC) : 44,989 votes 
 Ashok Ningayya Pujari (JD-S) : 37229
 Bhimashi Jarkiholi (BJP) : third place. (Brother of winner Ramesh Jarkiholi)

2018 Assembly Election
 Jarkiholi Ramesh Laxmanrao (INC) : 90,249 votes
 Ashok Ningayyaswami Pujari (BJP) : 75,969

2019 Bypoll
 Jarkiholi Ramesh Laxmanrao (BJP) : 87,450 votes
 Lakhan Laxmanrao Jarkiholi (Indian National Congress) : 58,444

See also 
 Belagavi District
 List of constituencies of Karnataka Legislative Assembly

References 

Assembly constituencies of Karnataka